Petrus (or Peter) van Mastricht (or Maastricht) (1630 – February 9, 1706) was a Reformed theologian.

He was born in Cologne to a refugee from Maastricht during the Dutch revolt. His father's family name was originally "Schoning," but he changed it to "van Mastricht" on moving to Cologne. Petrus occasionally used the Latinized pseudonym Scheuneneus. Johannes Hoornbeeck was Masticht's pastor from 1639 to 1643 and his teacher at the University of Utrecht starting in 1647, along with Gisbertus Voetius and others. From 1650 to 1652 he took a tour of study at Leiden University and possibly Oxford and the University of Heidelberg. From there he took pastorates at Xanten, Glückstadt, Frankfurt an der Oder, and Duisburg. While Mastricht is considered to be a follower of the school of Voetius, his Classis (ecclesiastical) in Xanten was predominantly Cocceian, a school to which Voetians were opposed. For this reason, and because of some irenic statements Mastricht made, he is considered to have been somewhat ecumenical in contrast to the vitriolic polemics common between Voetians and Coccieans of his day. He completed his Master of Arts and Doctor of Theology at the University of Duisburg in 1669 while serving as a pastor. Mastricht served as professor of Hebrew and theology at that university from 1670 to 1677. He then succeeded Voetius as professor of Hebrew and theology at the University of Utrecht in 1677. He also served as an elder and supply preacher for the classis of Amsterdam. He served there until he became too infirm and began teaching at home in 1700. He died February 9, 1706.

Mastricht, following his teachers Voetius and Hoornbeeck, saw theology as essentially practical, but did not see the use of scholastic theological method as antithetical to the practical use of theology for Christian piety. He opposed the rising influence of Cartesianism among the Reformed by writing treatises against Christopher Wittich, Petrus Allinga, and Balthasar Bekker.

A growing scholarship is anticipated in the fields of Post-reformation and Jonathan Edwards studies as translations of Mastricht's magnum opus of theology, the Theoretico-practica theologia, in an English edition and a new Dutch edition are released to the market in 2018. See Petrus van Mastricht, Theoretical-practical Theology, Todd M. Rester (transl.), Joel R. Beeke (ed.) (Grand Rapids: Reformation Heritage Books, 2018—) three out of seven volumes have already been published; Petrus van Mastricht, Theoretisch- praktische godgeleerdheid (Barneveld: Gebr. Koster / Stichting Gereformeerd Erfgoed, 2018—).

References

Bibliography

Further reading
Neele, Adriaan C. Petrus van Mastricht (1630–1706), Reformed Orthodoxy: Method and Piety', Brill's Series in Church History vol. 35. Leiden, the Netherlands: Brill, 2009.
Neele, Adriaan Cornelis. Petrus van Mastricht (1630-1706): Text, Context, and Interpretation. Göttingen: Vandenhoeck & Ruprecht (forthcoming 2019/20).
Selected readings 18th - 21st century:

Eighteenth century

Pontanus, Hendricus. Laudatio Funebris In excessum Doctissimi Et Sanctissimi Senis, Petri van Mastrigt, S. S. Theol. Doctoris & Professoris: Quam jussu amplissimi Senatus Academici D. XXIV. Februarii / postridie sepulturae dixit Henricus Pontanus. Rotterdam: van Veen, 1706. 

Pontanus, Hendricus. Liick En Lof-Reden Op het Affterven van den Hooghgeleerden en seer Godsaligen Ouden Man, Petrus van Maastricht, Doctor en Hoogleermeester der H. Godtsgeleertheyt. Welke uyt last van de Hooghaensienlijke Raad der Academie op den 24. van Sprockelmaand des Jaars 1706. 's anderen daags na de Begraeffenis, gedaen heeft Henricus Pontanus,  trans. C. T. V. D. M. Leyden: Jan Van Damme, [ca. 1706].

Burman, Caspar. Trajectum eruditum, virorum doctrina inlustrium, qui in urbe Trajecto et regione Trajectensi nati sunt sive ibi habitarunt, vitas, fata et scripta exhibens. Utrecht: Padenburg, 1738, 212–213.

Zedler, Johann Heinrich. “Mastricht, Peter von,” Grosses vollständiges Universal-Lexicon Aller Wissenschafften und Künste. Leipzig: Gleditsch, 1739, 19:300-301.

Pontanus, Hendricus. “Lyk-enLof-Reede over het Afsterven van Petrus van Mastricht,”Petrus van Mastricht, Beschouwende en Praktikale Godgeleerdheit,waarin alle godgeleerde hoofdstukken hen, het Bijbelverklarenden Leerstellige, Wederleggende en Praktikale deel, door eenen onafgebroken schakel onderscheidelijk samengevoegt, voorgestelt word. Rotterdam: Hendrik van Pelt, Utrecht:  Jan Jacob van Poolsum, 1749.

Allgemeines Gelehrten-Lexicon, Darinne die Gelehrten aller Stände sowohl männ- als weiblichen Geschlechts, welche vom Anfange der Welt bis auf die ietzige Zeit gelebt, und sich der gelehrten Welt bekannt gemacht, Nach ihrer Geburt, Leben, merckwürdigen Geschichten, Absterben und Schrifften aus den glaubwürdigsten Scribenten in alphabetischer Ordnung beschrieben warden, Christian Gottlieb Jöcher (ed.). Leipzig: Verlag Johann Friedrich Gleditsch, Leipzig, 1751, 3:271.

Paquot, Jean Noël. Mémoires pour servir à l'histoire  littéraire des dix-sept provinces des Pays-Bas, de la principauté de Liége, et de quelques contrées voisines. Louvain: de l'Imprimerie académique, 1765, 369-372.

Kok, Jacobus, Vaderlandsch woordenboek, Oorspronklyk verzameld. Amsterdam, Johannes Allart, 1789, 12:283.

Nineteenth century

Glasius, Barend. Biographisch Woordenboek van Nederlandsche Godgeleerden. Gebr. Muller, ’s-Hertogenbosch, 1867, 2:470.

Aa, Abraham Jacob van der. Biographisch woordenboek: bevattend levensbeschrijvingen van zoodanige personen, die zich op eenigerlei wijze in ons vaderland hebben vermaard gemaakt. Haarlem: J.J. van Beedbrode, 1869, XII:361-362.

Cuno, Friedrich Wilhelm, “Mastricht, Peter von,” Allgemeine Deutsche Biographie. Duncker & Humblot, Leipzig 1884, 20:340.

Twentieth century

Blok, P.J, Molhuysen, P.C. Nieuw Nederlandsch biografisch woordenboek. Leiden: A.W Sijthoof's Uitgeverij-Maatschappij N.V, 1937, X:591-592.

Linde, S. van der. “Mastricht, Petrus van,” Christelijke Encyclopaedie voor het Nederlansche volk, F. W. Grosheide (ed.) (Kampen: Kok, 1956), 4:250-251.

Kaajan, H. “Mastricht (Petrus van),” Christelijke Encyclopaedie voor het Nederlansche volk, 2nd revised edition, F. W. Grosheide (ed.) (Kampen: Kok, 1959), 4:252-251.

Twenty-first century

Neele, Adriaan C. “Petrus van Mastricht,” Biographisch-Bibliographisch Kirchenlexikon Bremen: Bautz, 2000, 17:1439.

Asselt, W.J. van. “Petrus van Mastricht,” Biographisch Lexicon voor de geschiedenis van het Nederlands Protestantisme, ed. O. J. De Jong, F. J. R. Knetsch, D. Nauta, G. H. M. Posthumus Meyjes, and J. Trapman. Kampen: Kok, 2001, 5:360-362.

Neele, Adriaan C. “A study of divine spirituality, simplicity, and immutability in Petrus van Mastricht's doctrine of God.” Master's Thesis: Calvin Theological Seminary, 2002.

Tellingen, A. E. van.  “Het leven en enige aspecten uit de theologie van Petrus van Mastricht (1630-1706).” Master's Thesis: Faculty of Theology of University of Utrecht, 2003.

Goudriaan, A. “Petrus van Mastrigt,” The Dictionary of Seventeenth and Eighteenth-Century Dutch Philosophers. Bristol: Thoemmes Continuum, 2003, 2:340.

Neele, Adriaan C. “The Art of Living to God: A Study of Method and Piety in the Theoretica-practica theologia of Petrus van Mastricht (1630–1706)”' (Ph.D. Dissertation: University of Utrecht, 2005. Ibid., Pretoria: Pretoria University Press, 2005).

Goudriaan, Aza. Reformed Orthodoxy and Philosophy, 1625–1750: Gisbertus Voetius, Petrus Van Mastricht, and Anthonius Driessen, Brill's Series in Church History vol. 26. Leiden, the Netherlands: Brill, 2006.

Ellis, Brannon E. “Christ Our Righteousness: Petrus Van Mastricht's (1630-1706) High Orthodox Doctrine of Justification in Its Pre-Enlightenment Context.” Master's Thesis: Westminster Seminary California, 2006.

Fisk Philip J. “The integral relation of impeccability and freedom to the projects of Cyril of Alexandria, John Calvin, Petrus van Mastricht, and Jonathan Edwards.” Master's Thesis: Westminster Theological Seminary, 2008.

Burg, J.C. van. “Extern en intern: Uitwendige en inwendige roeping bij Petrus van Mastricht (1630-1706).” Master's Thesis: Faculty of Humanities, Utrecht University, 2010.

Neele, Adriaan C. “The Reception of John Calvin's Work by Petrus van Mastricht (1630—1706).” Church History and Religious Culture (January 2011) 91(1/2):149-163.

Petrus van Mastricht, The Best Method of Preaching. The Use of Theoretical-Practical Theology. Translated and Introduced by Todd M. Rester. Grand Rapids, MI: Reformation Heritage Books, 2013.

Yoshiyuki, Kato. “Deus Sive Natura: the Dutch controversy over the radical concept of God, 1660-1690.” PhD. Dissertation: Princeton Theological Seminary, 2013.

Neele, Adriaan C. “Petrus van Mastricht,” Encyclopedie Nadere Reformatie, Willem op ’t Hof (ed.). Utrecht: Uitgeverij De Groot Goudriaan, 2016, II:98-102.

Neele, Adriaan C. “Petrus van Mastricht 1630-1706): Life and Work,” Petrus van Mastricht, Theoretical-Practical Theology, Todd M. Rester (transl.), Joel R. Beeke (ed.) (Grand Rapids, MI: Reformation Heritage Books, 2018) I:xxv-lxiii

Pontanus, Hendricus. “Funeral oration on the death of Petrus van Mastricht,” Petrus van Mastricht, Theoretical-Practical Theology, Todd M. Rester (transl.), Joel R. Beeke (ed.) (Grand Rapids, MI: Reformation Heritage Books, 2018), I:lxv-xci.

External links

17th-century Calvinist and Reformed theologians
Clergy from Cologne
1630 births
1706 deaths
Utrecht University alumni
Academic staff of Utrecht University
Dutch Calvinist and Reformed theologians